The 1874 Wellington City mayoral election was the first election for the Mayor of Wellington to be conducted by public vote. The election was won by William Sefton Moorhouse, who defeated former mayor Joseph Dransfield.

Background
Prior conventions dictated that Wellington's mayors were chosen by the city councillors from amongst themselves. In December 1874 an election open to the voting public was held with the intention of ratepayers selecting who would occupy the office of mayor for the 1875 term. The election was held on 17 December and saw William Sefton Moorhouse defeat Joe Dransfield by a 2 to 1 vote margin.

Election results
The following table gives the election results:

Notes

References

Mayoral elections in Wellington
1874 elections in New Zealand
Politics of the Wellington Region
1870s in Wellington